Tensaw may refer to:
 Tensaw, Alabama, an unincorporated community in Baldwin County, Alabama, United States
 Tensaw River, a distributary of the Mobile River, in southern Alabama, United States
 USS Tensaw, a Sassaba-class district harbor tug that served the U.S. Navy during World War II